The Best Actor Award is one of main awards of the Feature Film Competition at the Karlovy Vary International Film Festival. It is conferred on the best actor, or the best actors ex aequo.

Best Actor Award

References

External links
  The official festival site / History

Karlovy Vary International Film Festival
Czech film awards
International film awards